Events from the year 1835 in Scotland.

Incumbents

Law officers 
 Lord Advocate – Sir William Rae, Bt until April; then John Murray
 Solicitor General for Scotland – Duncan McNeill; then John Cunninghame

Judiciary 
 Lord President of the Court of Session – Lord Granton
 Lord Justice General – The Duke of Montrose
 Lord Justice Clerk – Lord Boyle

Events 

 21 January – Airdrie Savings Bank opens its doors to business; it will remain as an independent trustee savings bank until 2017.
 29 May – the General Assembly of the Church of Scotland confirms the Veto Act which allows a majority of heads of families to exclude a presentee from a parish, legislation which is subsequently ruled as invalid.
 3 July – Slamannan Railway authorised.
 21 July – Paisley and Renfrew Railway authorised.
 Alloa Coal Company established as a partnership by William Mitchell and others to work coal pits in Clackmannanshire.
 Roderick Murchison names the Silurian period in geology.
 An edition of the Chronicle of Melrose edited by Joseph Stevenson is published in Edinburgh for the Bannatyne Club.

Births 
 28 January – Robert Herbert Story, minister of the Church of Scotland and Principal of the University of Glasgow (died 1907)
 February – James Davis, soldier, recipient of the Victoria Cross (died 1893)
 9 February – John Malcolmson, soldier, recipient of the Victoria Cross (died 1902 in London)
 3 March – William Fraser Rae, journalist and author (died 1905 in England)
 19 March – Edmund Montgomery, philosopher, scientist and physician (died 1911 in the United States)
 29 March
 Madeleine Smith, socialite, accused in a murder trial (died 1928 in the United States)
 James Taylor, tea planter (died 1892 in Ceylon)
 5 April – Donald Cameron, 24th Lochiel, diplomat and Conservative politician (died 1905)
 3 May – Edward Hargitt, ornithologist and landscape painter (died 1895)
 18 May – Sir Fitzroy Maclean, 10th Baronet, soldier and clan chief (died 1936)
 28 May – James Small, laird (died 1900)
 17 June – James Brunton Stephens, poet (died 1902 in Australia)
 20 June – Andrew Tennant, pastoralist (died 1913 in Australia)
 11 July – John Macvicar Anderson, architect (died 1915 in London)
 15 July – Louisa Stevenson, campaigner for women's rights (died 1908)
 21 July – Robert Munro, archaeologist (died 1920)
 27 July – William Boyd Stewart, minister of the Baptist church and educationalist (died 1912 in Canada)
 18 August – Robert Murdoch Smith, military engineer, archaeologist and diplomat (died 1900)
 5 September – Thomas Cadell, soldier, recipient of the Victoria Cross (died 1919)
 2 October – James Stirling, steam locomotive engineer (died 1917 in Ashford, Kent)
 25 October – William McTaggart, marine painter (died 1910)
 15 November – Archibald Scott Cleghorn, businessman who marries into the royal family of Hawaii (died 1910 in Hawaii)
 25 November – Andrew Carnegie, steel magnate and philanthropist (died 1919 in the United States)
 13 December – Archibald Hamilton Charteris, minister of the Church of Scotland and theologian (died 1906)
 28 December – Archibald Geikie, geologist (died 1924 in England)
 James Park, soldier, recipient of the Victoria Cross (killed in action 1858 in India)
 Mungo Park, golfer (died 1904)

Deaths 
 14 April – Joseph Grant, poet (born 1805)
 5 June – Sir William Honyman, Lord Armadale, landowner and judge (born 1756)
 5 August – Thomas M'Crie the elder, minister of the church and historian (born 1772)
 16 September – Henry Belfrage, minister of the Secession church (born 1774)
 2 October – John Mackay Wilson, writer (born 1804)
 1 November – William Motherwell, poet (born 1797)
 9 November – Michael Scott, author and autobiographer who wrote under the pseudonym Tom Cringle (born 1789)
 21 November – James Hogg, "the Ettrick shepherd", poet and novelist (born 1770)
 21 December – Sir John Sinclair, 1st Baronet, agriculturalist, politician, economist and statistician (born 1754)

The arts
 26 September – première of Donizetti's opera Lucia di Lammermoor in Naples.
 30 December – première of Donizetti's opera Maria Stuarda at La Scala in Milan.
 Hugh Miller publishes Scenes and Legends in the North of Scotland.

See also 

 1835 in the United Kingdom

References 

 
Scotland
1830s in Scotland